Gyeongguk daejeon (translated as the State Code or the National Code) is a complete code of law that comprises all the laws,  customs and decrees released since the late Goryeo Dynasty to the early Joseon Dynasty. Sorted according to the relevant Ministries (Yukyo), it had been a basis for over 500 years of Joseon Dynasty politics. 

The previous code of law was the Gyeongje yukjeon (經濟六典, Six Codes of Governance) and its revised edition, Sokyukjeon (續六典, Amended Six Codes of Governance) which were issued during the reign of the state founder, King Taejo.

The new compilation started in 1460 (Sejo 6) by the part relative to Taxation. In 1467 (Sejo 13), the compilation of the entire book  was finished and named Gyeongguk Daejeon, but repeated revisions and supplements have delayed the final publication.
When Seongjong was crowned, a first revision began to be implemented in 1471 and is named Sinmyo Daejeon (辛卯大典). Then it was renovated in 1474 and therefore named the Gabo Daejeon (甲午大典). A third version, the Eulsa Daejeon, was released in 1485 (Seongjong 32), and was registered as the final one.

See also
Yukjo
Joseon Dynasty politics
History of Korea

Notes

References

Joseon dynasty
Politics of Korea
Korean law
Legal codes
Korean books
Chinese-language literature of Korea